Charlie's Kitchen ("The Double Cheeseburger King") is a restaurant serving American fare with New England specialties in the Harvard Square neighborhood of Cambridge, Massachusetts.  “Charlie’s” houses bars on two separate floors; additionally, a front patio and backyard beer garden are open seasonally. The Boston Phoenix named it one of the best dive bars in Boston in 2009.

History
Opened by Charlie Lambrose in 1951, Charlie's Kitchen is considered to be one of the last vestiges of "old" Harvard Square. It is located at 10 Eliot Street in Cambridge, Massachusetts.  Waitress Helen Metros has waited tables at Charlie's for over 50 years.

Green Initiatives
Despite the grungy exterior, Charlie's Kitchen's management has undertaken several eco-friendly initiatives. Solar panels on the roof heat water for kitchen-use and the restaurant composts all of its food waste and recycles. Some plastics, including the beer garden cups, are also compostable. Three vehicles run on the restaurant's waste fry oil.

Awards
Charlie's Kitchen's jukebox has won the Boston Phoenix’s reader-polled "Best of Boston Award for Best Jukebox" for the past five years, most recently in 2010. It also won The Improper Bostonian's Boston's Best Bar for the Harvard Square Neighborhood in 2010 and the Weekly Dig's Dig This Award for Best Outdoor dining in 2009.

References

External links

Restaurants in Cambridge, Massachusetts
Harvard Square
Restaurants established in 1951
1951 establishments in Massachusetts